The Tenth Air Force (10 AF) is a unit of the U.S. Air Force, specifically a numbered air force of the Air Force Reserve Command (AFRC). 10 AF is headquartered at Naval Air Station Fort Worth Joint Reserve Base/Carswell Field (formerly Carswell AFB), Texas.

The command directs the activities of 14,000 Air Force Reservists and 950 civilians located at 30 military installations throughout the United States.  10 AF is the AFRC numbered air force whose units and aircraft are primarily gained by the Combat Air Forces (CAF), specifically Air Combat Command (ACC), with a smaller number also gained by Air Force Global Strike Command (AFGSC), Pacific Air Forces (PACAF), Air Force Special Operations Command (AFSOC) and Air Education and Training Command (AETC).  In addition, Tenth Air Force units fly satellites for Air Force Space Command (AFSPC) in support of the Department of Defense and NOAA.

Tenth Air Force was a United States Army Air Forces combat air force created for operations in India, Burma and Indochina during World War II in the China Burma India Theater of operations.  It was established at New Delhi, India, on 12 February 1942, around a nucleus of air force personnel newly arrived from Java and the Philippines, under the command of Major General (later Lieutenant General) Louis Brereton. In the years since World War II, the 10th Air Force has served both US air defense under the former Air Defense Command and Aerospace Defense Command, and reserve training and readiness programs under the cognizance of the Air Force Reserve (AFRES) and the Air Force Reserve Command (AFRC).

The 10th Air Force is commanded by Maj Gen Bryan P. Radliff.

Overview
Tenth Air Force, located at Naval Air Station Fort Worth Joint Reserve Base, Texas, directs the activities of nearly 16,000 reservists and 636 civilians located at 31 military installations throughout the United States.	
The mission of Tenth Air Force is to exercise command supervision of its assigned Reserve units to ensure they maintain the highest combat capability to augment active forces in support of national objectives.

With approximately 60 full-time headquarters staff members, Tenth Air Force acts as the focal point for all matters pertaining to assigned Air Force Reserve units and individuals. With the assistance of 36 traditional reservists assigned, the headquarters monitors and provides assistance to all subordinate units to help resolve problem areas and more efficiently maintain unit combat readiness.	

The headquarters is responsible for managing and supervising five fighter wings comprising eleven fighter squadrons and seven fighter groups; one rescue wing comprising six air rescue squadrons in two groups; one bomb wing; one airborne warning and control group; one special operations wing; one space wing comprising nine squadrons; one regional support group; and more than seventy non-flying units.

If mobilized, the flying units with custody of their own aircraft and their support elements would be gained by Air Combat Command (ACC), Air Force Special Operations Command (AFSOC), and Air Force Global Strike Command (AFGSC), with other units gained by Air Force Space Command (AFSPC), Air Education and Training Command (AETC), Air Mobility Command (AMC), United States Air Forces in Europe (USAFE) and Pacific Air Forces (PACAF). Tenth Air Force is the only Numbered Air Force that touches every Major Command in USAF with the exception of the Air Force Materiel Command (AFMC).

The flying organizations within Tenth Air Force include fighter units equipped with the F-16 Fighting Falcon and A-10 Thunderbolt II; air rescue units equipped with the HC-130 Hercules and the HH-60 Pave Hawk helicopter; a bomb wing equipped with the B-52 Stratofortress; a special operations unit equipped with the C-145A Skytruck and the U-28; fighter associate program groups embedded with active duty USAF wings and equipped with the F-22 Raptor, F-15E Strike Eagle and F-16 Fighting Falcon; an airborne warning and control associate unit equipped with the E-3 Sentry; and associate units flying MQ-1 Predator, MQ-9 Reaper and RQ-4 Global Hawk Unmanned Aerial Vehicles.  The 610th Regional Support Group at NAS Fort Worth JRB is responsible for the management of twelve geographically separated units throughout the United States.	

Other organizations include combat air operations, medical, civil engineer, combat logistics, communications, security forces, aerial port, intelligence and aeromedical units. Additionally, the Reserve portion of the Air National Guard/Air Force Reserve Test Center (AATC), which conducts operational test and evaluation of fighter equipment and improvements, is directly assigned to Tenth Air Force.

Reservists from 10th Air Force units are routinely deployed to Air Expeditionary units in combat areas of Central and Southwest Asia as part of the Overseas Contingency Operation.

Units
Operational units of Tenth Air Force are:
  Combat Air Forces
 44th Fighter Group - Tyndall AFB, Florida
 301st Fighter Wing – NAS JRB Fort Worth, Texas
 307th Bomb Wing – Barksdale AFB, Louisiana
 414th Fighter Group – Seymour Johnson AFB, North Carolina
 419th Fighter Wing – Hill AFB, Utah
 442d Fighter Wing – Whiteman AFB, Missouri
 477th Fighter Group – Elmendorf AFB, Alaska
 482d Fighter Wing – Homestead ARB, Florida
 919th Special Operations Wing – Eglin AFB Aux Field No. 3 / Duke Field, Florida
 920th Rescue Wing – Patrick Space Force Base, Florida
 924th Fighter Group - Davis-Monthan AFB, Arizona
 926th Group – Nellis AFB, Nevada and Creech AFB, Nevada
 943d Rescue Group – Davis-Monthan AFB, Arizona
 655th ISR Group - Wright-Patterson AFB, Ohio

 Regional Support Groups
 610th Regional Support Group – NAS JRB Fort Worth, Texas

 Space Forces
 310th Space Wing – Schriever AFB, Colorado

 Pilot Training Forces
 944th Fighter Wing – Luke AFB, Arizona

 Command/Control Forces
 513th Air Control Group – Tinker AFB, Oklahoma

Tenth Air Force Squadrons, Flights, and Operational Locations are also stationed at:

 Hickam Air Force Base, Hawaii
 Holloman Air Force Base, New Mexico
 Langley Air Force Base, Virginia
 March ARB, California

 Moody Air Force Base, Georgia
 Offutt Air Force Base, Nebraska
 Portland IAP / Portland Air National Guard Base, Oregon
 Sheppard Air Force Base, Texas
 Vandenberg Air Force Base, California
 Beale Air Force Base, California

History

World War II

Tenth Air Force was constituted on 4 February 1942 and activated on 12 February, built up around a nucleus of air force personnel newly arrived from Java and the Philippines, under the command of Maj. Gen. Lewis H. Brereton. It had its headquarters at New Delhi.  Components of the air force moved to India over a three-month period from March to May 1942. It was responsible for creating, operating and safeguarding the India-China Ferry, more commonly known as the Hump airlift, between 8 April and 1 December 1942, first with its Assam-Burma-China Command until 16 July, then the India-China Ferry Command until 1 December, when jurisdiction for the airlift passed to the Air Transport Command.

The Tenth Air Force initially provided control of all USAAF combat operations in the China Burma India Theater under theater commander Lt. Gen. Joseph Stilwell. 

Under General Clayton Bissell's re-organization of the Tenth Air Force, five commanders reported to him: Brigadier General Caleb V. Haynes ran the India Air Task Force, created 8 October 1942, Brig. Gen. Claire Chennault ran the China Air Task Force, created 4 July 1942 to replace the American Volunteer Group, Robert F. Tate ran the India–China Ferry Command, Robert C. Oliver ran the Tenth's service arm and Francis M. Brady operated the large air base at Karachi. Haynes's task force assembled three bomber groups: the 7th Bombardment Group, the 51st Fighter Group and the 341st Bombardment Group (Medium). On paper were more squadrons not yet prepared for war—some had no aircraft, some had too little training and some were bare cadres.

In March 1943 the China Air Task Force was dissolved and its components made part of the new Fourteenth Air Force, activated in China under Chennault. The Tenth operated in India and Burma as part of the Allied Eastern Air Command until it moved to China late in July 1945.

The Tenth Air Force conducted offensive strategic bombing operations in Burma and Thailand and supported Allied ground efforts with close air support and operations against Japanese communications and supply installations.  After the end of the war in China, the command headquarters departed from Shanghai on 15 December 1945, being attached to Army Service Forces at Fort Lawton, Washington, where the last personnel were demobilized and the command inactivated, being returned to HQ USAAF on 6 January 1946.

Air Defense Command
In March 1946, USAAF Chief General Carl Spaatz had undertaken a major re-organization of the postwar USAAF that had included the establishment of Major Commands (MAJCOM), who would report directly to HQ United States Army Air Forces.  Continental Air Forces was inactivated, and Tenth Air Force was assigned to the postwar Air Defense Command in March 1946 and subsequently to Continental Air Command (ConAC) in December 1948 being primarily concerned with air defense.

The command was re-activated on 24 May 1946 at Brooks Field (later, Brooks AFB), Texas.  It moved to Offutt AFB, Nebraska, 1 July 1948; Fort Benjamin Harrison (later, Benjamin Harrison AFB), Indiana, 25 September 1948.  It was originally assigned to provide air defense over a wide region from Kentucky to Montana; from the Four Corners of southwest Colorado to the Northeast tip of Minnesota, north of the borders of New Mexico, Oklahoma, Arkansas and Tennessee.

The 56th Fighter Wing at Selfridge AFB, Michigan, joined Tenth Air Force on 1 December 1948, transferring in from SAC's Fifteenth Air Force.

In addition to the command and control of the active Air Force interceptor and radar units in its region, it also became the command organization for the Air Force Reserve and state Air National Guard units.  By 1949 with the establishment of the Western Air Defense Force (WADF) and Eastern Air Defense Force (EADF), the air defense mission of the command was transferred to WADF, leaving Tenth AF free to focus on its reserve training tasks.

Moved to Selfridge AFB, Michigan, 16 January 1950 where for the next decade it concentrated on air reserve training throughout the decade. On 1 July 1960, the Fifth Air Force Reserve Region was formed at Selfridge AFB. The Fifth Air Force Reserve Region was one of five Reserve regions and became operational on 1 September 1960, under the control of Continental Air Command (CAC), as a result, Tenth Air Force was discontinued, and inactivated, on 1 September 1960.

Tenth Air Force was reactivated on 20 January 1966, at Richards-Gebaur AFB, Missouri as part of Air Defense Command with the inactivation of its organization of Air Defense Sectors.  Its area of responsibility was the central region of the United States east of the Rocky Mountains to the Mississippi River and the northern peninsula of Michigan.

On 16 January 1968 Air Defense Command was re-designated Aerospace Defense Command (ADCOM) as part of a restructuring of USAF air defense forces. Tenth Air Force's second period of service was short lived, however, and the command was again inactivated as the result of a major ADCOM reorganization on 31 December 1969 of the First Fourth, Tenth Air Forces and several Air Divisions. This reorganization was the result of the need to eliminate intermediate levels of command in ADCOM driven by budget reductions and a perceived lessening of the need for continental air defense against attacking Soviet aircraft.

ADCOM reassigned the units under the inactivated Tenth Air Force primarily to the 14th, 23d and 24th Air Divisions.

Air Force Reserve
Continental Air Command was discontinued on 1 August 1968, and was replaced by Headquarters Air Force Reserve, located at Robins AFB, Georgia. In July 1969, the Fourth Region moved from Randolph AFB to Ellington AFB, near Houston, Texas. On 31 December 1969, the five regions were merged into three. The responsibilities of the Fourth and Fifth Regions were consolidated into the new Central Air Force Reserve Region. Eastern Region became responsible for the First and Second Region areas, the Sixth Region became the Western Region. This change increased the area of responsibility of Central Region from five states to 14, ranging from the Canadian to the Mexican borders.  As a result of these consolidations, Tenth Air Force was again inactivated on 31 December 1969.

When Air Force operations were phased out of Ellington AFB, Central Region Headquarters moved to Bergstrom AFB in Austin, Texas on 10 March 1976. The Air Force Reserve's entire intermediate management structure was then realigned effective 8 October 1976; and the Reserve Regions were inactivated and succeeded by the currently activated Tenth Air Force. Redesignated Tenth Air Force (Reserve) on 24 September 1976, the unit activated in the Reserve on 8 October 1976 at Bergstrom AFB, Texas, assigned to Air Force Reserve. It was redesignated Tenth Air Force on 1 December 1985.

As a result, the unit assumed command over all Tactical Air Command-gained and Strategic Air Command-gained Air Force Reserve units regardless of geographic location. With the inactivation of TAC and SAC in 1992, Tenth Air Force today is responsible for command supervision of fighter, bomber, rescue, airborne warning and control, special operations, flying training, combat air operations battle staff, and space reserve units.

Lineage
 Established as 10th Air Force on 4 February 1942.
 Activated on 12 February 1942
 Redesignated Tenth Air Force on 18 September 1942
 Inactivated on 6 January 1946
 Activated on 24 May 1946
 Discontinued, and inactivated, on 1 September 1960
 Activated on 20 January 1966
 Organized on 1 April 1966
 Inactivated on 31 December 1969
 Redesignated Tenth Air Force (Reserve) on 24 September 1976
 Activated on 8 October 1976
 Redesignated Tenth Air Force on 1 December 1985

Assignments
 Air Force Combat Command, 12 February 1942
 U.S. Army Forces in China-Burma-India Theater, 5 March 1942
 Army Air Forces, India-Burma Sector, 21 August 1943
 Attached to Eastern Air Command, 15 December 1943 – 1 June 1945
 Further attached to Strategic Air Force, Eastern Air Command, 15 December 1943 – 20 June 1944
 Army Air Forces, India-Burma Theater, 27 October 1944
 Army Air Forces, China Theater, 6 July 1945
 U.S. Army Air Forces, China Theater, 25 August 1945
 Army Service Forces, Seattle Port of Embarkation, 5–6 January 1946
 Air Defense Command, 24 May 1946
 Continental Air Command, 1 December 1948 – 1 September 1960
 Air (later, Aerospace) Defense Command, 20 January 1966 – 31 December 1969
 Air Force Reserve (later, Air Force Reserve Command), 8 October 1976 – present

Components

Commands
 IX Air Service Area: 19 March – 1 July 1948, assigned to Tenth Air Force, 19 March – 1 July 1948
 X Air Force Service Command, assigned from 1 February – 20 August 1943. Activated 1 May 1942 with headquarters at New Delhi, India. Brigadier General Elmer E. Adler was appointed commanding officer. 10 AFSC was redesignated China-Burma-India Air Service Command on 20 August 1943.
 XXI Air Force Service: 19 March – 1 July 1948
 Karachi American Air Base: 13 February – 20 August 1943

Air Divisions

 30th Air Division: 16 December 1949 – 1 September 1950; 1 April 1966 – 18 September 1968
 73d Air Division: 1 July 1948 – 27 June 1949
 96th Air Division: 1 July 1948 – 27 June 1949
 322d Air Division: 1 July 1948 – 27 June 1949
 323d Air Division: 1 July 1948 – 27 June 1949.
 20th Air Division: 1 April 1966 – 31 December 1967

 28th Air Division: 1 April 1966 – 19 November 1969
 29th Air Division: 1 April 1966 – 15 September 1969
 31st Air Division: 1 July 1968 – 31 December 1969
 24th Air Division: 19 November – 1 December 1969
 25th Air Division: 15 September – 1 December 1969
 26th Air Division: 19 November – 1 December 1969
 27th Air Division: 15 September – 19 November 1969

District
 2 Air Reserve: 1 December 1951 – 1 April 1954.

Regions
 Fourth Air Force Reserve: 1 Jul – 1 September 1960
 Fifth Air Force Reserve: 1 Jul – 1 September 1960

Wings and groups
 552d Airborne Early Warning and Control Wing, 15 September – 15 November 1969
 4780th Air Defense Wing (Training), 1 July 1968 – 15 November 1969
 12th Bombardment Group, c. 21 March 1944 - c. 24 January 1945
 341st Bombardment Group, 15 September 1942 - 3 October 1942, then resubordinated to the India Air Task Force; then reassigned back to Tenth Air Force on 16 October 1943.

Stations

 Patterson Field, Ohio 4 February 1942
 New Delhi, India, March–May 1942
 Barrackpore, India. October 1943
 Belvedere Palace, Calcutta, India, January 1944
 Kanjikoah, India, June 1944
 Myitkyina, Burma, November 1944
 Bhamo, Burma, February 1945
 Piardoba, India May 1945
 Kunming, China, June–July 1945
 Liuchow, China, August 1945
 Kunming, China, June–July 1945

 Liuchow, China, August 1945
 Kunming, China, August 1945
 Shanghai, China, October 1945
 Fort Lawton, Washington, 5–6 January 1946
 Brooks Field (later, AFB), Texas, 24 May 1946
 Offut Air Force Base, Nebraska, 1 July 1948
 Selfridge Air Force Base, Michigan, January 1950-1 September 1960
 Richards-Gebaur Air Force Base, Missouri, 1 April 1966 – 31 December 1969
 Bergstrom Air Force Base, Texas, 8 October 1976
 Carswell ARS, Texas, 30 June 1996

List of commanders

See also

 Objective, Burma!

References

Notes

Bibliography

 Latimer, Jon. Burma: The Forgotten War. London: John Murray, 2004. .
 Maurer, Maurer Air Force Combat Units of World War II. Pub USAF, Reprint 1986 (first published in 1961).
 Rust, Kenn C. Tenth Air Force Story...in World War II. Temple City, California: Historical Aviation Album, 1980 (republished 1992 by Sunshine House of Terre Haute, Indiana). .
 Weaver, Herbert and Marvin A. Rapp. The Tenth Air Force, 1942 (USAAF Historical Study No.12). Air Force Historical Research Agency, 1944.
 Weaver, Herbert and Marvin A. Rapp. The Tenth Air Force, 1 January – 10 March 1943 (USAAF Historical Study No.104). Air Force Historical Research Agency, 1944.
 Weaver, Herbert and Marvin A. Rapp. The Tenth Air Force, 1943 (USAAF Historical Study No.117). Air Force Historical Research Agency, 1946.
 White, Edwin L. Ten Thousand Tons by Xmas. St. Petersburg, Florida: Valkrie Press, 1975.
 Unknown author. This is the Tenth Air Force. Mitchell Air Force Base, New York: Office of Information Services, Continental Air Command, 1959.
 Maurer, Maurer (1983). Air Force Combat Units Of World War II. Maxwell AFB, Alabama: Office of Air Force History. .
 Ravenstein, Charles A. (1984). Air Force Combat Wings Lineage and Honors Histories 1947–1977. Maxwell AFB, Alabama: Office of Air Force History. .
  A Handbook of Aerospace Defense Organization 1946 – 1980,  by Lloyd H. Cornett and Mildred W. Johnson, Office of History, Aerospace Defense Center, Peterson Air Force Base, Colorado

External links
 Tenth Air Force Factsheet
 Dedicated to the members of the 341st Bomb Group  China-Burma-India Theater
 Second World War 10th Air Force history
 Life and Times of the 341st Bomb Group 
 Second World War 10th Air Force Unit Listing

Military units and formations in Texas
Military units and formations established in 1942
 Air Force 10
10
10